Bienfait  is a town in Saskatchewan on Highway 18 that is  east of Estevan. It is surrounded by the RM of Coalfields.

For services, Bienfait has one school, a gas station, a curling rink and an ice rink, which is where the Bienfait Coalers of the Big 6 Hockey League play. The Coalers have won the Lincoln Trophy 15 times, which is the most of any team.

The Bienfait Museum is in the old CPR Station on the east end of town. The original location for the station was on the CPR line on the north side of town.

History 
Bienfait was incorporated as the Village of Bienfait on April 16, 1912. It became a town on March 1, 1957, and was named by the Canadian Pacific Railway after Antoine Charles Bienfait, a banker with Adolphe Boissevain & Company of Amsterdam since the firm had been involved in the sale of Canadian Pacific shares in Europe.

In 1931, striking coal miners marched from Bienfait to nearby Estevan, which resulted in the Estevan Riot.

Train / Caboose Lot 
On the north side of town on Railway Avenue at the head of Main Street, sits a Manitoba & Saskatchewan Coal Company (M&S) Locomotive #3522, which is on the Canadian Register of Historic Places. The M & S Locomotive was built in 1907 and used to transport coal from the mines to Bienfait to market until 1968. It was one of the last commercially-functioning steam engines in Canada.

The town of Bienfait acquired the locomotive in 1968 and the caboose in 2000. The caboose is an old Canadian National Railway caboose. This site was added to the list of historic places in Saskatchewan on March, 28 2002.

Demographics 

Gallery

See also 
 List of communities in Saskatchewan
 List of towns in Saskatchewan
 Coal mining in Saskatchewan

References 

Coalfields No. 4, Saskatchewan
Towns in Saskatchewan
Division No. 1, Saskatchewan